Valentine Fortin (born 24 April 1999) is a French racing cyclist. She rode in the women's scratch event at the 2018 UCI Track Cycling World Championships.

Major results
2022
 10th GP Oetingen

References

External links
 

1999 births
Living people
French female cyclists
Olympic cyclists of France
Cyclists at the 2020 Summer Olympics
Sportspeople from Toulouse
Cyclists from Occitania (administrative region)
21st-century French women